Chawri Bazar is a specialized wholesale market of brass, copper and paper products. Established in 1840, with a hardware market, it was the first wholesale market of Old Delhi it lies to the west of Jama Masjid in Delhi.

It can be reached by taking the street just near the middle projection of Jama Masjid's western (rear) wall. It was accessible via the Chawri Bazar underground station of the Delhi Metro.

History
Once popularly known for its dancing girls and courtesans in the 19th century, frequented by nobility and rich alike. After the advent of the British as the tawaif culture faded out, subsequently, prostitutes came to occupy the upper floors of the market. This eventually led to the area becoming a hub of criminality and thus the Delhi Municipal Committee evicted them from the area altogether, the street is named after a Marathi word chawri, which means meeting place. The street got this name mainly because here a 'sabha' or meeting would take place in front of a noble's house and he would try settling the disputes before it would reach the emperor. A second reason is probably that a gathering used to get organized when a respected dancer performed and showed the finer nuances of her skill. The whole ambience of the street, however, got changed after the 1857 war when the British destroyed many huge mansions of the nobles.

Built of Lakhori bricks, a small canon is placed over the gateways of both the buildings. The buildings have semi-octagonal projections on both sides with two small rooms on either side. The rooms have semi-circular arches to enter and it is difficult to visualize its former shape. The main features of the buildings are its niches and arches at the roof-level on the semi-octagonal projections, though difficult to make out.

Today, Chawri Bazaar is a very busy road as labourers with their laden backs, cars, rickshaws, scooters and walkers almost battle for the passage during the peak market hours. Again it is also a wholesale market but you will be allowed to purchase a brass or copper idol of Lord Vishnu, Buddha and others. The shops also keep many useful items like jewellery boxes, vases, pots and oil lamps. However, at present Chawri Bazar is more known as the wholesale market of paper products than copper or brass. From beautiful wedding cards to attractive wallpapers to nice greetings to any type of paper required for any use, everything is available here.

Chawri Bazar is a road which has Jama Masjid on one end and Hauz Quazi on the other end. Now, there is a metro station at Hauz Quazi by the name of Chawri Bazar. Nai Sarak, which is famous for Books and Ladies' Garments, joins it at Bad-shah Bulla. Besides Nai Sarak, there is another way through Ballimaran which connects Chawri bazar to Chandni Chowk.

References

External links
 Chawri Bazar Metro Station at Wikimapia

1840 establishments in British India
Bazaars in India
Retail markets in Delhi
Shopping districts and streets in India
Wholesale markets in India